Albert Calland (10 September 1929 – 3 January 2014) was an English professional footballer who played as a centre forward in the Football League for Torquay United. He was born in Bishop Auckland, County Durham.

Calland joined Torquay United in March 1950 from Langley Park, joining his older brother Ralph at Plainmoor. He had to wait a couple of years for his Gulls' debut, and soon after his younger brother Ted also arrived at the club. He scored 11 times in only 24 league games before leaving league football.

Calland reappeared in Devon playing for Bideford in the 1956 season with his second game being against Torquay United Reserves in the Western League Cup having scored four goals on his debut the week before against Chippenham Town in the Western League itself.

References

1929 births
2014 deaths
Sportspeople from Bishop Auckland
Footballers from County Durham
English footballers
Association football forwards
Langley Park F.C. players
Torquay United F.C. players
Spennymoor United F.C. players
Bideford A.F.C. players
English Football League players